Lake Nippenicket, known locally as The Nip, is a freshwater pond in the town of Bridgewater, Massachusetts, and immediately adjacent to Raynham, Massachusetts. The lake borders a tiny portion of Route 104, and is near the junction of I-495 and Route 24. Lake Nippenicket is part of the Taunton River Watershed, emptying into the Town River and into the Taunton River, and a good-size portion of it is included with the Hockomock Swamp Wildlife Management Area. The lake is named after a Native American tribe from that area.

References

External links
MassWildlife Lake map and information

Taunton River watershed
Lakes of Bristol County, Massachusetts
Lakes of Plymouth County, Massachusetts
Lakes of Massachusetts